, born  February 24, 1987 in Tokyo, is a Japanese singer, model and actress. She played Sailor Mercury in the Sailor Moon musicals and was Naru Osaka in the live action adaptation of Sailor Moon.  Several of her songs have been used in anime series and other television shows, from a localization of Lizzie McGuire to Ouran High School Host Club. She was born to a Japanese father and Spanish Filipino mother.

Biography

Career 
Kawabe was involved in the Sailor Moon Musicals starting in 2000 when she was 12 years old. She played Sailor Mercury and participated in five productions including the 10th anniversary special in 2002. She made guest appearances at Fan Kansha and released a DVD called Sera Myu. Afterwards, she handed her Sailor Mercury role to Wakayama Manami, but got involved in the live-action Sailor Moon drama as Naru Osaka in 2003.

Kawabe released the single "Be Your Girl" on April 27, 2004. This became the ending theme song to the anime Elfen Lied, and her other song, "Hoshi ni Negai wo" was the end theme song to Otogizoshi. She released "Shining" in 2004, and "Kizunairo" in 2005. The song "I Can't Wait", from the "Kizunairo" single was used as the theme song to the Japanese version of the show Lizzie McGuire. She released her first album, Brilliance in March 2005, and the single "Candy Baby" in July. Kawabe's next major single was "Sakura Kiss" which was the theme song for the anime Ouran High School Host Club. The single charted in Oricon, peaking at 71.

In addition to acting and singing, she has worked as a model, appearing in publications such as Tokuma Shoten's Love Berry magazine. She hosted a weekly show in Harajuku.

Personal life 
Kawabe married producer Masato Ochi on August 8, 2008. After 7 years of marriage, the couple amicably divorced in 2015. They have one daughter. 

She also released a cookbook called Husband's lunch in 2010.

Discography

Albums

Singles

References

External links 
  at Ameblo 
 Chieco Kawabe @ The Oracle

1987 births
Actresses from Tokyo
Anime musicians
Japanese film actresses
Japanese gravure models
Japanese musical theatre actresses
Japanese women pop singers
Japanese people of Filipino descent
Japanese people of Spanish descent
Japanese television personalities
Living people
Former Stardust Promotion artists
Singers from Tokyo
20th-century Japanese actresses
20th-century Japanese women singers
21st-century Japanese actresses
21st-century Japanese women singers